Neolecta is a genus of ascomycetous fungi that have fruiting bodies in the shape of unbranched to lobed bright yellowish, orangish to pale yellow-green colored, club-shaped, smooth, fleshy columns up to about 7 cm tall. The species share the English designation "Earth tongues" along with some better-known fungi (e.g. Geoglossum, Microglossum) with a similar general form, but in fact they are only distantly related.

Neolecta is the only genus belonging to the family Neolectaceae, which is the only family belonging to the order Neolectales. Neolectales, in turn, is the only order belonging to the class Neolectomycetes, which belongs to the subdivision Taphrinomycotina of the Ascomycota.

Neolecta is found in Asia, North America, Northern Europe and southern Brazil. The species all live in association with trees, and at least one, N. vitellina, grows from rootlets of its host, but it is not known whether the fungus is parasitic, saprotrophic, or mutualistic. It is said to be edible.

Neolecta does not have any close relatives. Phylogenetically, it clusters weakly with a bizarre group of basal Ascomycota including: Taphrina, a dimorphic, half yeast, half filamentous genus parasitic on leaves, branches, and catkins; Schizosaccharomyces, a genus of fission yeasts (e.g. Schizosaccharomyces pombe); and Pneumocystis, a yeast-like genus of mammalian parasites. Neolecta fruitbodies consist of hyphae and a hymenium. The hymenium lacks paraphyses and the asci lack croziers, which makes the genus distinctive among other earth-tongues. Neolecta vitellina forms masses of conidia by budding, hinting at the possibility that it also produces a yeast state. However, to date, the genus has been unculturable, suggesting it is either obligately parasitic or symbiotic. It provides important evidence for the evolutionary history of the Ascomycota and has been called a living fossil.

Neolecta irregularis genome
The Neolecta irregularis genome has been sequenced. Sequence analysis has revealed that rudimentary multicellularity is deeply rooted in the Ascomycota.

References

External links

 George Barron's mushroom illustrations
 Palaeos "Introduction to the Ascomycota"
 The Oregon Coalition of Interdisciplinary Databases: "Archiascomycetes: Early Diverging Ascomycetes"

Ascomycota
Taxa named by Carlo Luigi Spegazzini
Fungi described in 1881